The 2016–17 season was Chelsea's 103rd competitive season, 28th consecutive season in the top flight of English football, 25th consecutive season in the Premier League and 69th year in existence as a football club. In addition to the domestic league, Chelsea participated in the FA Cup and League Cup; however, they did not participate in any UEFA competition for the first time since the 1996–97 season. The season covered the period from 1 July 2016 to 30 June 2017.

Chelsea won their fifth Premier League title with a 1–0 win away to West Bromwich Albion on 12 May. Chelsea lost the FA Cup Final to Arsenal after a 2–1 loss on 27 May. This season was the last for John Terry, who announced he will leave when his contract ends at the end of the season after Chelsea's final game.

The season saw Chelsea equal the Premier League records for consecutive wins in a season (13), fewest draws in a season (3), fewest home draws in a season (0), and home and away wins against different sides (12). They also managed to break the record for number of wins in a season (30), as well as record the second-highest points tally in Premier League history (93).

Team kits
Supplier: Adidas / Sponsor: Yokohama Tyres

Month by month review

June

On 9 June, Vitesse signed an extension on Nathan's loan and then two weeks later also signed an extension on Lewis Baker's loan.

On 13 June, Chelsea announced it had released Marco Amelia and Kevin Wright, and also confirmed that loanees Radamel Falcao and Alexandre Pato would be returning to their respective teams. After spending a season-and-a-half on loan at Udinese, Udinese activated a clause in Stipe Perica's contract to sign him permanently.

On 22 June, Charly Musonda's loan at Real Betis was extended for the 2016–17 campaign. On 27 June Chelsea youngster Kyle Scott joined Dutch club Willem II on trial after handing in multiple transfer requests in April 2016. On 29 June, Nathan Aké joined AFC Bournemouth on loan after a successful loan season with Watford in 2015–16.

In June, Chelsea submitted a total of three bids for Roma's Radja Nainggolan, with the third reportedly valued at €40 million; the player ultimately decided to stay after receiving an improved contract from Roma the following month.

July
On 1 July, it was announced that Pedro would switch to the number 11 shirt, recently vacated by the loan expiration of Alexandre Pato.

On 3 July, Michy Batshuayi signed a five-year deal at Chelsea after an accepted bid of €40 million (£33.2 million). Batshuayi became the first signing by new Chelsea manager Antonio Conte. After being linked with multiple teams, on 6 July Jérémie Boga joined La Liga side Granada on a season-long loan.

After months of speculation, promising right-back Ola Aina signed a new four-year contract. Although Tika Musonda was on the release list, Chelsea opted to give him a new one-year contract.

On 11 July, Chelsea under-21 assistant manager Andy Myers joined Vitesse on a one-year deal as Henk Fraser's assistant manager. With Myers joining the Dutch side, Ian Howell is promoted as the new U-21 assistant manager.
 On 12 July, Players' Player of the Year Willian signed a new four-year contract. On 13 July, Tomáš Kalas returned to the Championship, joining Fulham on a season-long loan. After promotion to the first-team in the previous season, Kasey Palmer joins Huddersfield Town on 15 July. On 20 July, Kiwomya joined League 2 side Crewe Alexandra on loan until 9 January 2017. On 22 July, it was announced that Matej Delač would join Belgian side Mouscron-Péruwelz on a season-long loan.

John Swift was given a new contract in June, but decided to turn it down to sign with Championship side Reading on 14 July.

On 16 July, N'Golo Kanté signed a five-year contract with Chelsea valued at £30 million from Leicester City, becoming Conte's second signing.

Chelsea lost its first pre-season match, against Rapid Wien, which ended in a 2–0 defeat. In the following match of its Austrian tour, Chelsea won 3–0 against Wolfsberger AC, with youngsters Bertrand Traoré, Ruben Loftus-Cheek and Nathaniel Chalobah each scoring a goal. The following day, Chelsea had a closed-door friendly with local team Atus Ferlach, ending its Austrian tour with an 8–0 win over the champions of the Austrian fourth-tier Kärntner Liga.

On 28 July, Chelsea started its tour of the United States with a 1–0 victory over Premier League rival Liverpool thanks to an early goal from Gary Cahill. On 30 July, Chelsea set a record during the 3–2 loss against Real Madrid, with a record attendance of 105,826.

August

Youngsters Fikayo Tomori and Mukhtar Ali both signed new long-term contracts.

On 2 August, Baba Rahman returned to the Bundesliga on a season-long loan with Schalke 04 after failing to impress Conte during the pre-season. Although Roma announced the signing Mohamed Salah back in October 2015, on 3 August Chelsea finalised the move for an additional €15 million. On 5 August, Abraham signed for Championship side Bristol City on a season-long loan, with no recall clause and Papy Djilobodji joined Sunderland for a fee reported to be in the region of £8 million. On 6 August, Houghton joined Doncaster Rovers on loan until 3 January 2017.

On 3 August, in its U.S. tour, Chelsea defeated Milan 3–1. Chelsea concluded its pre-season campaign with a 4–2 victory over Werder Bremen.

On 12 August, Bertrand Traoré signed a new three-year contract. He then joined Ajax on loan for the season while Danilo Pantić joined Excelsior on loan. On 14 August 2016, Michael Hector joined German side Eintracht Frankfurt on a season-long loan. On 15 August 2016, goalkeeper Jamal Blackman joined League Two side Wycombe Wanderers on loan until 3 January 2017, while Isaiah Brown joined Rotherham United on loan until the end of the 2016–17 season. On 23 August, Marko Marin joined Greek side Olympiacos on a three-year deal for a fee thought to be in the region of £3 million. On 25 August 2016, Eduardo joined Chelsea on free transfer, signing a one-year deal. On 27 August, Mario Pašalić joined Milan on a season-long loan.

On 30 August, strikers Patrick Bamford and Loïc Rémy joined Burnley and Crystal Palace respectively on season-long loans. Later in the day, Kenedy was also confirmed to have left on a season-long loan deal, to Watford.

Chelsea started its Premier League season with a 2–1 win over London rivals West Ham United, with goals scored by Eden Hazard and Diego Costa. In its second league game, Chelsea left it late yet again, scoring two late goals in the second half to earn their first away win of the season over Watford. Chelsea continued its winning streak after beating Bristol Rovers to advance to the third round of the EFL Cup.

On 27 August, in the 3–0 home victory over Burnley, goalkeeper Thibaut Courtois kept the first clean sheet of the season and broke a run of 13 home Premier League games without a clean sheet, with their last being in a 1–0 win over Norwich City in November 2015. In the month of August, Chelsea earned all nine available points and was in second place of the Premier League.

Last day of the transfer window

On the last day of the transfer window, Chelsea completed a total of thirteen transfers, with 11 loan deals and two additions. Youngsters, Dion Conroy and Nathan Baxter, both joined up with semi-professional clubs, while Jake Clarke-Salter and Charlie Colkett both joined League One side Bristol Rovers. Lucas Piazon joined Tomáš Kalas at Fulham until 15 January 2017 while Christian Atsu joined Newcastle United on a season loan. Kenneth Omeruo returned to the Turkish league, joining newly promoted side Alanyaspor after signing a new contract until 2019. Cristián Cuevas returned to Sint-Truiden for a second season while Islam Feruz joined fellow loanee Matej Delač at Mouscron-Péruwelz. Matt Miazga joined up with the Dutch side Vitesse after his move to Espanyol fell through due to paperwork.

Juan Cuadrado would return on loan to Juventus for three seasons which will see Juventus pay a loan fee of €5 million a season, and also contain a buy-out clause €25 million with add-on clauses.

Marcos Alonso returned to the Premier League for a fee believed to be £23 million from Fiorentina, signing a five-year contract. Chelsea's last summer transfer deal was the £30 million signing of David Luiz, who returned to the London side from Paris Saint-Germain after joining PSG from Chelsea in 2014. His return was completed after he insisted on the move and stated that it was a "good deal" for the French champions after the club had initially refused the offer.

September
After the international break, Chelsea faced Swansea City at the Liberty Stadium in Wales on 11 September. The match ended in a 2–2 draw, with both of Chelsea's goals coming from Diego Costa. The draw meant that it was the first game of the season in which Chelsea dropped points. In the closing minutes, John Terry suffered an ankle injury and left the pitch on crutches; scans later showed that his injury was to rule him out for approximately ten days.

On 16 September, Chelsea suffered their first defeat of the season at home, as Liverpool won 2–1 at Stamford Bridge. David Luiz made his second Chelsea debut following his deadline day move from PSG. Two Liverpool goals in the first half, from Dejan Lovren's close range finish and Jordan Henderson's thunderous 25-yard strike, put the game out of reach for the hosts, who managed to peg one goal back through Diego Costa.

On 20 September, Chelsea beat Leicester City 4–2 after extra-time to advance into the fourth round of the EFL Cup. In the match, youngster Nathaniel Chalobah made his first-team debut and Gary Cahill served as captain for the first time.

Disappointment followed on 24 September in the form of another league defeat, this time a 3–0 defeat against Arsenal at the Emirates Stadium. Alexis Sánchez pounced in the 11th minute after a horrific defensive error from Gary Cahill let him roam free on goal, followed three minutes later by another goal from Theo Walcott. Mesut Özil then exposed Chelsea on the counter-attack five minutes before the break, putting the game beyond Chelsea's reach and sending them further down the league table. The win was also Arsenal's first against Chelsea in the league since October 2011. In the month of September, Chelsea earned only a single point out of nine available points and were in eighth place in the Premier League.

October

After suffering back-to-back Premier League losses to top-four rivals Liverpool and Arsenal, Antonio Conte switched to a 3–4–3 formation against Hull City on the 1 October which earned him a 2–0 victory, thanks to a goal apiece from Willian and Diego Costa. The new formation featured a back-three pairing of Gary Cahill, David Luiz and César Azpilicueta, with two wing-backs providing cover in the form of Marcos Alonso on the left-hand side and Victor Moses on the right-hand side.

On 15 October, Chelsea earned a 3–0 home victory over reigning Premier League champions Leicester. The hosts put in a domineering performance against the champions, with Diego Costa opening the scoring for Chelsea in the seventh minute. Two further goals followed from Eden Hazard and Victor Moses to inflict Leicester's fourth consecutive away league defeat. Leicester could have potentially pegged a goal back following David Luiz hitting his own goalpost as a result of himself attempting to clear a Leicester corner, however it would merely have been a consolation as Chelsea comfortably claimed another three points.

On 23 October, Chelsea stunned Manchester United and former manager José Mourinho at Stamford Bridge with a thumping 4–0 win. Chelsea went into the lead within 30 seconds of the match, thanks to Spanish winger Pedro capitalizing on poor defending with a goal. Gary Cahill smashed in the second after United allowed Eden Hazard's corner to bounce into their box. United offered little sign of making a comeback, falling further behind when Hazard drilled in a precise 15-yard strike. The game was well and truly over with a rare 70th-minute goal from N'Golo Kanté compounding Mourinho's misery on his return to Stamford Bridge. With this win, Chelsea had gone eight league games, winning four and drawing four, without losing against Manchester United, making it their best run against the Red Devils in club history.

Chelsea lost their next game, an EFL Cup game, 2–1 against West Ham at the newly renovated Olympic Stadium on 26 October 2016, knocking them out of the competition. The game was marred by crowd disturbances amongst both sets of rival fans, with plastic bottles, coins and seats being thrown across the London Stadium. Prior to the match, there had been nine arrests outside the stadium and 23 banning orders issued by West Ham for disorderly fan behaviour since moving into their new stadium.

Chelsea bounced back with a 2–0 win in the Premier League over Southampton at St Mary's Stadium on 30 October. The win meant Chelsea won all their Premier League matches in the month of October; a run of four wins, scoring 11 goals without conceding any. The last time Chelsea had a four-game winning run was April 2015 and the four consecutive clean sheets were also the first since August 2010 when Chelsea had a run of six consecutive Premier League games without conceding.

November
On 5 November, Chelsea stunned Everton at Stamford Bridge with a 5–0 win. The hosts scored two goals in quick succession, coming from Eden Hazard and Marcos Alonso in the 19th and 20th minutes of the game. Diego Costa added a third goal before half time to seal the game, however Chelsea did not relent with two further goals coming in the second half, one of these being a Pedro goal into an open net. Everton were completely dominated throughout the whole game and penned into their own half, only having one off-target shot in comparison to Chelsea's 21 shots. With this win, Chelsea had five consecutive league victories, scoring 16 goals and conceding none in their last five games. The win also sent The Blues top of the Premier League table going into the international break.

On 18 November, Chelsea's Eden Hazard and Antonio Conte both won the Premier League Player of the Month and the Premier League Manager of the Month awards respectively for the month of October.

On 20 November, Chelsea earned their sixth consecutive league victory, beating Middlesbrough 1–0 at the Riverside Stadium. In the process, Diego Costa became the first player to reach double digits in league goals when he scored his tenth goal of the season.

On 26 November, Chelsea ended Tottenham Hotspur's unbeaten run since the start of the Premier League season, where Chelsea won 2–1. Chelsea conceded their first goal since the 3–0 away defeat to Arsenal in the form of a fantastic long-distance strike from Tottenham's Christian Eriksen, and were dominated throughout much of the first half, however Chelsea were able to equalize just before half time with a spectacular right-footed curled effort from Pedro. Spurs' miserable record at Stamford Bridge was extended to 30 games without a win – dating back to February 1990 – after Victor Moses scored what proved to be the winner six minutes after the restart. The win ensured that Chelsea would enter the month of December top of the Premier League.

December

On 3 December, Chelsea handed Manchester City their first home defeat after the Blues came back from a Gary Cahill own goal in the first half with three second-half goals to earn a 3–1 victory. The match ended in a wide-scale brawl that occurred as a result of a Sergio Agüero two legged lunge tackle on Chelsea defender David Luiz. Following the brawl, Aguero and Fernandinho were both sent off with straight red cards, Fernandinho being sent off due to his violent conduct against Chelsea midfielder Cesc Fàbregas. Aguero received a four-match ban for his actions, while Fernandinho received a three-match ban. Following the game, the FA charged both clubs involved with failing to control their player's on-pitch behaviour, with both clubs having until 8 December 2016 to respond to the charges.

On 9 December, Chelsea became the first club to collect three Premier League awards in the same month, picking up all the prizes for November: Diego Costa was named Player of the Month after registering two goals and two assists in three November contests; Antonio Conte was named Manager of the Month for the second successive month after guiding the club a perfect three wins out of three matches; and Pedro won Premier League Goal of the Month for November thanks to his curling effort from outside the box in the match against Spurs on 26 November.

On 11 December, Chelsea prevailed over West Bromwich Albion with a close 1–0 win, the only goal of the game coming in the 76th minute from Diego Costa, the Spaniard scoring his 12th goal of the season. The win sent Chelsea top of the table again, three points clear of second-placed Arsenal, and gave Chelsea their ninth consecutive league victory.

On 13 December, manager Antonio Conte confirmed that 20-year-old Brazilian winger Kenedy had returned to Chelsea from his loan spell at Watford. Kenedy had made just one substitute appearance for Watford during his loan spell.

On 14 December, Chelsea secured their tenth consecutive league victory with a 1–0 away win over Sunderland. Cesc Fàbregas scored his first league goal of the season in the 40th minute after an assist from Willian. Eden Hazard missed his first league game of the season after picking up a knock during the win over West Brom. César Azpilicueta made his 200th appearance for the Blues in the match, just one day after signing a three-and-a-half-year contract that will keep him at the club through the 2020 season.

On 17 December, Gary Cahill made his 300th appearance for the club as Chelsea narrowly won over Crystal Palace 1–0, away at Selhurst Park. The win takes Chelsea nine points clear of title chasers Liverpool and Arsenal, both having a game in hand over Chelsea. The win also meant that Chelsea are the third team in Premier League history to reach 500 league wins, after Arsenal and Manchester United. Chelsea also equal a club record with 11-straight league wins; Chelsea last achieved this feat from April to September 2009. Diego Costa and N'Golo Kanté both accumulated their fifth yellow cards of the season, resulting in themselves not being available for selection in the Boxing Day match against AFC Bournemouth. Diego Costa scored his 13th league goal of the season and his 50th for Chelsea since first signing. Diego Costa's 50th goal in 97 games for Chelsea meant that he eclipsed Didier Drogba's record of 50 goals in 112 games.

On 22 December, young Chelsea midfielder Charly Musonda made an early return from his loan spell at Real Betis after struggling for fitness and form while on loan. Musonda only made one start throughout his loan spell, having apparently fallen out with former Betis manager Gus Poyet.

On 23 December, Chelsea announced the permanent transfer of Oscar to Shanghai SIPG for a club record £52,000,000, to be completed within the January transfer window.

On 26 December, Chelsea earned their 12th straight league victory and broke their all-time record of successive league victories with a 3–0 home win over Bournemouth. A curled effort from Spanish winger Pedro, and a penalty from Eden Hazard in the 49th minute effectively sealed the game for the hosts. Chelsea's third, a stoppage time goal, came in the form of a Bournemouth own goal from defender Steve Cook, this being as a result of a Pedro shot deflecting off the Bournemouth defender and spinning over the goal line. Chelsea put up an encouraging performance in spite of having two of their key players, Diego Costa and N'Golo Kanté, suspended for the game. The win means that Chelsea remain top of the table and six points clear of second-placed Liverpool.

On 31 December, Chelsea equalled a top flight record of 13 consecutive wins in a single season with a thrilling 4–2 home victory over Stoke City. Goals from Gary Cahill with a headed effort, a second-half brace from Willian to help Chelsea regain the lead on two occasions in the match, and an 85th minute Diego Costa strike sent the Blues nine points clear of second-placed Liverpool going into the New Year, with Liverpool being able to cut the deficit to six points should they earn a victory against fellow title challengers Manchester City.

On the same day, Dutch midfielder Marco van Ginkel signed a new contract with the Blues, keeping him at Stamford Bridge until the end of the 2018–19 season, whilst also rejoining his former loan club PSV Eindhoven for the rest of the 2016–17 season.

January

On 1 January, goalkeeper Jamal Blackman extended his loan spell with League Two club Wycombe Wanderers until the end of the 2016–17 season.

On 4 January, Tottenham ended Chelsea's 13-game winning run by defeating them 2–0 at White Hart Lane. A brace from midfielder Dele Alli with goals just before and after half time, prevented Chelsea from writing Premier League history with a fourteenth successive win. However, the result itself did not affect Chelsea's position in the Premier League, with the Blues remaining in first place and five points clear of second-placed Liverpool following their draw with Sunderland.

On 6 January, long-serving midfielder Mikel John Obi completed a move to Chinese Super League club Tianjin TEDA for an undisclosed fee, having played 376 times for the Blues since joining in 2006, winning two Premier League titles, four FA Cups and the 2012 Champions League during his time at Stamford Bridge. Mikel had not featured under new Chelsea boss Antonio Conte all season, with Mikel himself stating that the time was right for "a new challenge".

Besides, Chelsea recalled young forward Isaiah Brown from his loan spell at Rotherham United, with Huddersfield Town signing him on loan for the remainder of the 2016–17 season. He joins fellow Chelsea loanee Kasey Palmer at Huddersfield.

On 8 January, Chelsea defeated Peterborough United 4–1 at home in the third round of the FA Cup. Goals from Michy Batshuayi, Willian and a brace from Pedro ensured that Chelsea would advance into the fourth round. Chelsea captain John Terry was sent off on his first start for the club since October, but the Blues held on for a convincing victory over Posh.

On the same day, Chelsea exercised a recall clause in Dutch defender Nathan Ake's season-long loan deal at Premier League club Bournemouth, following some impressive performances for the south coast club.

On 13 January, Antonio Conte won the December Premier League Manager of the Month. As a result, he became the first manager in history to win the award in three successive months.

On 14 January, Chelsea returned to winning ways in the league with a 3–0 victory over last season's Premier League champions Leicester City at the King Power Stadium. Marcos Alonso opened the scoring early on with Eden Hazard providing the assist, later scoring another to put the Blues 2–0 up shortly after half time. A third Chelsea goal from Pedro in the 71st minute secured up the three points for the away team, sending Chelsea seven points clear of second-placed Tottenham Hotspur at the summit of the Premier League. The win and three points also meant that Chelsea had surpassed their points total from the 2015–16 Premier League season, reaching 52 points compared to last season's 50 points.

On 17 January, Brazilian midfielder Lucas Piazon's loan at Fulham was extended until the end of the season.

On 18 January, young forward Patrick Bamford rejoined his former loan club Middlesbrough on a permanent basis for a reported £6 million.

On 22 January, The Blues defeated Hull City 2–0 at home. Diego Costa scored at his 100th appearance for the club at the 7th minute of first-half injury time. The long stoppage was a result of a clash of heads with between Gary Cahill and Hull midfielder Ryan Mason. Mason was sent to hospital and it was later confirmed that he sustained a skull fracture, while Cahill remained on the pitch and secured the victory with a header goal in the second half.

On 28 January, Chelsea defeated Brentford 4–0 at home in the West London derby in the fourth round of the FA Cup, Branislav Ivanović scored his first goal of the season and was later fouled to allow Michy Batshuayi to add a fourth from the penalty spot.

Youngsters Fikayo Tomori and Mukhtar Ali joined Brighton & Hove Albion and Vitesse respectively on loans until the end of the season.

On 31 January, Chelsea recorded their second draw of the season as they drew against Liverpool at Anfield. David Luiz scored a stunning freekick in the first half at his 100th Premier League appearance. It was also his first goal in his second spell at Chelsea. Georginio Wijnaldum equalised with his head after the break. The final result held to 1–1 after Diego Costa's penalty was saved by Simon Mignolet in the 76th minute. The Blues extended their lead at top of the Premier League to nine points as the two title contenders Arsenal and Tottenham Hotspur both dropped points on the same night.

February

On 1 February, Chelsea announced the departure of 32-year-old Serbian defender Branislav Ivanović. Ivanovic joined Russian side Zenit Saint Petersburg on a free transfer after nine years of service, having scored 34 goals in 377 appearances and won two Premier League medals, one Champions League medal, one Europa League medal, three FA Cup medals and one League Cup medal. He is also one of only five foreign players to reach the 300-game landmark for the Blues.

Branislav Ivanovic missed the 2012 UEFA Champions League Final due to suspension. However, he starred in the 2013 UEFA Europa League Final, scoring in the final minute of stoppage time to clinch a 2–1 win for Chelsea and with it their first Europa League title. He was subsequently named Man of the Match. Ivanovic was also outstanding during the title-winning campaign of 2014–15 and played in every minute of the 38 games. The Blues boasted the best defensive record in the league and he was one of six Chelsea players named in the Team of the Season. He ended his Chelsea career with a goal against Brentford in his final game.

On 4 February, Chelsea beat Arsenal 3–1 at home. Eden Hazard scored a magnificent solo goal in the 8th minute of second half. Cesc Fàbregas scored the third goal for the Blues against his former captained team, after an error by ex-Chelsea goalkeeper Petr Čech.

On the same day, the Blues announced that on 22 July, they would play Arsenal at Beijing National Stadium in preparation for next season.

March
On 8 March, Chelsea returned to the Olympic Stadium to face West Ham; this time the home side were beaten.

On 13 March, a goal from N'Golo Kanté in the FA Cup quarter-finals put holders Manchester United out of the tournament.

On 18 March, Chelsea won at Stoke 2–1, thus emerging from March unbeaten.

April

On 1 April, having taken the lead through Cesc Fàbregas, Chelsea lost 2–1 at home to South London club Crystal Palace, with all the goals being scored in the first eleven minutes.

On 5 April, Chelsea return to winning ways with a 2–1 home win over Manchester City.

On 16 April, Manchester United exacted revenge for being eliminated from the FA Cup the previous month with league victory over Chelsea at Old Trafford.

On 22 April, Chelsea won their FA Cup semi-final at the neutral venue of Wembley Stadium, despatching Tottenham 4–2.

On 25 April, Chelsea were 4–2 winners over Southampton: Eden Hazard and Gary Cahill netting in the first half and a Diego Costa double in the second-half; former Blues Oriol Romeu and Ryan Bertrand scored for Saints.

On 30 April, Chelsea won at Everton 3–0, featuring an "effort from outside the box" scored by Pedro, Gary Cahill scoring in his second consecutive game, and an 86th-minute strike from Willian.

May

On 8 May, goals from Diego Costa, Marcos Alonso and Nemanja Matić were enough to relegate visitors Middlesbrough back to the English Football League after just one season in the top-flight.

On 12 May, Chelsea defeated West Bromwich Albion 1–0 to clinch the Premier League title as they went ten points clear with two games remaining. Michy Batshuayi scored the winning goal in the 82nd minute. On the same day, Pedro was awarded his second – and Chelsea's third – Goal of the Month this season with his strike at Goodison Park.

On 15 May, a much-changed Chelsea side were 4–3 winners over Watford, with substitute Cesc Fàbregas finding the winner shortly before the away side had a man sent off, the other Blues goalscorers were John Terry, César Azpilicueta, and Michy Batshuayi. The Hertfordshire club gave the champions-elect that day a guard of honour; this included Kenedy, the player making his Chelsea league début having made one appearance for Watford earlier in the season before his loan deal was cancelled.

On 21 May, Chelsea defeated already-relegated Sunderland 5–1 with goals from Willian, Eden Hazard, Pedro and a brace from Michy Batshuayi – his fourth in three matches. It was the last league game for John Terry, who was subbed in the 26th minute to a standing ovation from all the supporters. This marked Chelsea's 30th league win this season, most by any team in a single Premier league season.

On 27 May, Chelsea fell behind to Arsenal in the 2017 FA Cup Final in the fourth minute to Alexis Sánchez' goal, and were reduced to ten men when Victor Moses received his second yellow card. However, despite Arsenal's extra-man advantage, Chelsea equalized through Diego Costa in the 76th minute. The London clubs would stay level for only three minutes before Aaron Ramsey headed in the winner.

Coaching staff

{|class="wikitable"
|-
!Position
!Staff
|-
|First-team Manager|| Antonio Conte
|-
|rowspan="3"|Assistant Managers|| Angelo Alessio
|-
| Steve Holland
|-
| Gianluca Conte
|-
|Technical Director|| Michael Emenalo
|-
|Club Ambassador/Assistant to the First-team|| Carlo Cudicini
|-
|Goalkeeper Coach|| Gianluca Spinelli
|-
|Assistant Goalkeeper Coach|| Henrique Hilário
|-
|rowspan="3"|Head Fitness Coaches|| Paolo Bertelli
|-
| Julio Tous
|-
| Chris Jones
|-
|Assistant Fitness Coach|| Constantino Coratti
|-
|Consultant Personal Trainer/Nutritionist|| Tiberio Ancora
|-
|Senior Opposition Scout|| Mick McGiven
|-
|Medical Director|| Paco Biosca
|-
|Head of Youth Development|| Neil Bath
|-
|Under-21 Team Manager|| Adi Viveash
|-
|Under-18 Team Manager|| Jody Morris
|-
|Head of Match Analysis Scout|| James Melbourne
|-

Other information

|-

Squad information

First team squad

 HG1 = Association-trained player
 HG2 = Club-trained player
 U21 = Under-21 player

New contracts

Transfers

In

Summer

Winter

Out

Summer

Winter

Loan out

Summer

Winter

Overall transfer activity

Expenditure
Summer:  £118,200,000

Winter:  £0

Total:  £118,200,000

Income
Summer:  £34,400,000

Winter:  £66,000,000

Total:  £100,400,000

Net Totals
Summer:  £83,800,000

Winter:  £66,000,000

Total:  £17,800,000

Pre-season
On 13 April 2016, it was announced that Chelsea would visit Austria for two pre-season friendlies against Rapid Wien and Wolfsberger AC. Chelsea concluded their pre-season campaign facing Bundesliga side Werder Bremen in Germany.

International Champions Cup

On 22 March 2016, the schedule for the 2016 International Champions Cup was announced that Chelsea would play Liverpool, Real Madrid and Milan.

Competitions

Premier League

League table

Results by matchday

Score overview

Matches

The fixtures for the 2016–17 season were announced on 15 June 2016 at 9:00 BST.

FA Cup

EFL Cup

Statistics

Appearances

Top scorers

The list is sorted by shirt number when total goals are equal.

Clean sheets
The list is sorted by shirt number when total clean sheets are equal.

Summary

Awards

Player

Manager

References

Chelsea
Chelsea F.C. seasons
English football championship-winning seasons